Cucumis umbellatus is a vine in the family Cucurbitaceae that is native to Western Australia throughout parts of the Kimberley region.

References

umbellatus
Plants described in 2011
Flora of Western Australia